This list of battles fought in Colorado is an incomplete list of military and other armed confrontations that have occurred within the boundaries of the modern US State of Colorado since European contact. The region was part of the Viceroyalty of New Spain from 1535 to 1682, New France from 1682 to 1762, Kingdom of Spain from 1762 to 1800, French First Republic 1800 to 1803, and part of the United States of America 1803–present (boundaries were disputed by Spain).  The southern portion of Colorado was considered by Spain as part of its northern territories.  Large portions of Colorado were subsequently under the administrative control of Mexico from 1800 to 1835, and the Republic of Texas from 1836 to 1846.  Full administrative control of Colorado was established on February 2, 1848 with the signing of the Treaty of Guadalupe Hidalgo which ended the Mexican–American War.

The Plains Indian Wars directly affected the region during westward expansion. By the end of the Nineteenth Century, Colorado became a focal point of labor violence and the Coal Wars, with instances of large-scale armed conflict between workers, private detectives, and state soldiers and police stretching into the 1920s.

Fights

See also

 History of Colorado
 Plains Indians Wars

Notes

Battles
Colorado